Karolina Pahlitzsch (born 5 April 1994) is a German athlete. She competed in the mixed 4 × 400 metres relay event at the 2019 World Athletics Championships. In 2019, she won the bronze medal in the team event at the 2019 European Games held in Minsk, Belarus.

References

External links

1994 births
Living people
German female sprinters
Place of birth missing (living people)
World Athletics Championships athletes for Germany
Athletes (track and field) at the 2019 European Games
European Games medalists in athletics
European Games bronze medalists for Germany